The Sweetwater River is a  long tributary of the North Platte River, in the U.S. state of Wyoming. As a part of the Mississippi River system, its waters eventually reach the Gulf of Mexico.

Course
The Sweetwater rises in southwestern Fremont County, at the continental divide near South Pass Wyoming, on the southern end of the Wind River Range. It flows ENE along the north side of the Antelope Hills, then ESE, through Fremont County, past Jeffrey City, between the Granite Mountains to the north and the Green Mountains (Wyoming) to the south, through what are now cattle-raising areas. In southern Natrona County, it passes Devil's Gate and Independence Rock along the Oregon, California and Mormon Trails, and empties into the North Platte as the Sweetwater arm of Pathfinder Reservoir.

History
The Sweetwater River valley provided a route used by fur trappers, mountain men and fur traders as they went to their annual summertime Rocky Mountain Rendezvous located usually somewhere along the Green River Wyoming. These trappers and traders soon established a path for their pack trains along the Sweetwater and eventually cleared a rough wagon trail to the Green River.

In fall of 1823, trappers and fur traders Jedediah Smith and Thomas Fitzpatrick led their trapping crew south from the Yellowstone River to the Sweetwater River. They were looking for a safe location to spend the winter. Smith reasoned since the Sweetwater flowed east it must eventually run into the Missouri River. Trying to transport their extensive fur collection down the Sweetwater and North Platte River, they found after a near disastrous canoe crash that the rivers in Wyoming were too swift and rough for water passage. On July 4, 1824, they cached their furs under a dome of rock they named Independence Rock and started their long trek on foot to the Missouri River via the Sweetwater, North Platte and Platte River valleys. Upon arriving back in a settled area on the Missouri River they bought pack horses (on credit) and retrieved their furs. They had re-discovered the route that Robert Stuart of the Astor Expedition had taken in 1813—eleven years before. Thomas Fitzpatrick was often hired as a trail guide when the fur trade almost ceased in 1840. Jedediah Smith was killed by Indians about 1831.

By 1843 the Sweetwater River valley was a regular wagon trail providing the water, grass and  fuel needed on the Oregon, California and Mormon Trails across Wyoming. The Sweetwater provided an almost direct path from the Platte and North Platte Rivers to the wide South Pass Continental Divide between the Atlantic Ocean rivers and Pacific Ocean rivers. South Pass was the easiest pass across the Atlantic and Pacific drainages. These wagon trails crossed the meandering Sweetwater River about nine times on their about 10 to 20 day trips along the Sweetwater River before they reached South Pass.  The Sweetwater River's connection to the California Trail is of particular interest to members of the Fraternity of Phi Gamma Delta, since it is a site where two early members met, including one of the fraternity's six founders.  At a time when such a meeting was incredibly unlikely, the coincidence was so fortuitous as to be chronicled in the fraternity's history.

See also
 List of rivers of Wyoming

References

Rivers of Wyoming
Bodies of water of Natrona County, Wyoming
Bodies of water of Fremont County, Wyoming
Tributaries of the North Platte River